Eric Symes Abbott KCVO (26 May 1906 – 6 June 1983) was an English Anglican priest and Dean of Westminster.

Abbott was born in Nottingham in 1906 to William Henry Abbott and Mary Symes, both schoolteachers.  He was educated at Nottingham High School and later studied classics and theology at Jesus College, Cambridge. He was ordained priest in 1931 and thereafter  held a number of different posts, such as chaplain (1932–1936) and dean (1945–1955) of King's College London, and warden of Keble College, Oxford (1956–1960).

He was appointed chaplain to King George VI (1948–1952) and Queen Elizabeth II (1952–1959). In 1959, he was made Dean of Westminster, a position he held until 1974.

As such he presided over the 900th anniversary of the founding of the abbey in 1965–1966. In 1966 he was knighted as a Knight Commander of the Royal Victorian Order (KCVO).     After the death of Princess Margaret it was reported that she regarded Eric Abbott as "a father figure."

Abbott never married. He died at Haslemere in 1983 and his funeral was held in Westminster Abbey. He is buried in the nave.

In his memory the Eric Symes Abbott Memorial Fund provides for annual lectures on spirituality, held alternately in Oxford and London. The first, delivered in 1986, was by Cardinal Basil Hume A full copy of all the previous lectures is held at King's College London.

Writings
Escape or freedom? (Heffer and Sons, Cambridge, 1939)
Foothold of faith (Dacre Press, Westminster, 1943)
Catholicity: a study in the conflict of Christian traditions in the West (Dacre Press, Westminster, 1947)
Education in the spiritual life (Doncaster, 1961)
The compassion of God and the Passion of Christ (Geoffrey Bles, London, 1963)

References

Sources
Evans, Sydney, "Abbott, Eric Symes (1906–1983)", Oxford Dictionary of National Biography, Oxford University Press, 2004

External links
Abbott’s archives at King’s College London
Bibliographic directory from Project Canterbury
 

1906 births
1983 deaths
People educated at Nottingham High School
Alumni of Jesus College, Cambridge
Chaplains of King's College London
Deans of King's College London
Fellows of King's College London
Knights Commander of the Royal Victorian Order
People from Nottingham
Deans of Westminster
20th-century English Anglican priests
Wardens of Keble College, Oxford
Staff of Lincoln Theological College